Endiama E.P. (Empresa Nacional de Diamantes E.P.) is the national diamond company of Angola and it is the exclusive concessionary of mining rights in the domain of diamonds. Angola's state-run diamond company Endiama produced 8.55 million carats of diamonds in 2010.

Endiama's primary property is Catoca, which is a joint venture between Endiama (32.8%), Russia based ALROSA (32.8%), China based LLI (18%), and Brazil based Odebrecht (16.4%).  Catoca is the seventh largest diamond mine in the world, and is estimated to produce over 7 million carats of diamonds in 2014 worth just under $1 billion.

Through the long time former president of Endiama, Noé Baltazar, who is part of the inner circle of José Eduardo dos Santos, Isabel dos Santos entered the diamond business with her stakes in SODIAM and ASCORP in which both Endiama and Noé Baltazar also had stakes as well as Marc Rich, Lucien Goldberg, and Lev Leviev for the latter.

Operations
Subsidiaries; links are to the  subsidiaries' pages at Endiam's main site:
SODIAM/Sociedade de Comercialização de Diamantes de Angola diamond purchasing; diamond sales; diamond trade management; company works to combat illegal diamond trade 
ENDIAMA Prospecção & Produção/ENDIAMA P & P diamond prospecting and mining
Enditrade/Sociedade Enditrade transport and logistics; transport of ore and diamonds between mining and processing facilities; produces lubricants in association with Sonangol; has recently begun producing heavy industrial equipment in association with its own subsidiary Endibell
Fundação Brilhante/FB  social programs; cultural programs
Clínica Sagrada Esperança/CSE  an 80-bed hospital in Luanda; medical specialties represented include cardiology, neurosurgery, neurology, gynecology, obstetrics, etc etc
Air Diamantes Angola/ADA  - company aviation
Grupo Desportivo Sagrada Esperança/GDSE - "Sagrada Esperança", a major league football club in Dondo.

Endiama's mining operations, each of which is a company in its own right:

 Associacao Chitotolo (35% ownership) located in N'Zagi - Lunda Norte; besides mining, Chitololo is involved in education via its Projecto Educar
 Sociedade de Desenvolvimento Mineiro (SDM) , in Cuango, 50% ownership in association with Odebrecht in Brasil.
 Sociedade Mineira de Catoca/Catoca   32.8%, in association with Almazzi Rossi and Alrosa in Russia, Daumonty Financing Company in Israel and Odebrecht Mining Services in Brasil.
 Sociedade Mineira do Angola, Lda (20%) 
 Projecto Fucaúma/Fucauma diamond mine  40% owned in association with Trans Hex and others; 
 Projecto Luarica/Luarica diamond mine  38% owned in association with Transhex, Micol and others
Sociedade Mineira do Lucapa/SML  51% owned by Endiama, 49% owned by Sociedade Portuguesa de Empreendimentos/SPE; operations are located in the Chicapa River and Luachimo River basins.
Sociedade Mineira do Camatchia-Camagico/LUÓ  a joint venture formed in 2003 with Hipergesta, Angodiam and ESCOM-Alrosa/Espírito Santo and Alrosa.
Chimbongo 
Alfa 5  diamond production
Projecto Yetwene 50% owned, in association with Mining BV/Grupo Lev Leviev; located in the Camissombo exploration area in the province of Lunda Norte.

See also
 Conflict diamond
 Diamonds as an investment

References

External links
 ENDIAMA

Companies based in Luanda
Economy of Angola
Diamond mining companies
Mining companies of Angola